Rexford is a city in Thomas County, Kansas, United States.  As of the 2020 census, the population of the city was 197.

History
Rexford was founded in approximately 1887. It was named in honor of a member of the Rexford family who died in a fire that engulfed the family home. They were some of the first settlers in the area and had been there for years.

The first post office in Rexford was established in August 1888.

Geography
Rexford is located at  (39.470512, -100.743975). Rexford is located along U.S. Route 83 about 20 miles north of Interstate 70.

Climate
The climate in this area is characterized by hot, humid summers and generally mild to cool winters. The region has occasional, significant blizzards when the entire area can be without electricity. According to the Köppen Climate Classification system, Rexford has a humid subtropical climate, abbreviated "Cfa" on climate maps.

Demographics

2010 census
According to the 2010 census, there were 232 people, 84 households, and 52 families residing in the city. The racial makeup of the city was 74.1% White, 0.4% African American, 0.4% Native American, 23.3% from other races, and 1.7% from two or more races. Hispanic or Latino of any race were 26.3% of the population.

There were 84 households, of which 47.6% had children under the age of 18 living with them, 51.2% were married couples living together, 7.1% had a female householder with no husband present, 3.6% had a male householder with no wife present, and 38.1% were non-families. 31.0% of all households were made up of individuals, and 13.1% had someone living alone who was 65 years of age or older. The average household size was 2.76 and the average family size was 3.71.

The median age in the city was 31.5 years. 36.2% of residents were under the age of 18; 6.5% were between the ages of 18 and 24; 27.6% were from 25 to 44; 15.5% were from 45 to 64; and 14.2% were 65 years of age or older. The gender makeup of the city was 50.0% male and 50.0% female.

2000 census
According to the 2000 census, there were 157 people, 78 households, and 41 families residing in the city. The racial makeup of the city was 100.00% White. Hispanic or Latino of any race were 1.91% of the population.

There were 78 households, out of which 23.1% had children under the age of 18 living with them, 47.4% were married couples living together, 3.8% had a female householder with no husband present, and 46.2% were non-families. 44.9% of all households were made up of individuals, and 19.2% had someone living alone who was 65 years of age or older. The average household size was 2.01 and the average family size was 2.74.

In the city, the population was spread out, with 24.2% under the age of 18, 3.2% from 18 to 24, 24.2% from 25 to 44, 21.7% from 45 to 64, and 26.8% who were 65 years of age or older. The median age was 44 years. For every 100 females, there were 101.3 males. For every 100 females age 18 and over, there were 91.9 males.

The median income for a household in the city was $40,156, and the median income for a family was $39,688. Males had a median income of $34,375 versus $24,375 for females. The per capita income for the city was $21,301. About 4.7% of families and 2.5% of the population were below the poverty line, including 5.6% of those under the age of eighteen and none of those 65 or over.

Education
School unification consolidated Menlo, Rexford and Selden schools forming USD 316 Golden Plains. Golden Plains High School is located in Rexford. The Golden Plains High School mascot is the Bulldog.

Rexford High School was closed through school unification. The Rexford High School mascot was also the Bulldog.

See also
 Philip Houston Bed and Breakfast

References

Further reading

External links
 Rexford - Directory of Public Officials
 USD 316, local school district
 Rexford city map, KDOT

Cities in Thomas County, Kansas
Cities in Kansas